The 2014 West Asian Football Federation Women's Championship tournament was held from 15 to 19 April 2014 in Amman, Jordan. It was the fifth edition of the West Asian Football Federation Women's Championship.

The tournament was won by Jordan, who won all of their games.

Teams and format
Four teams entered the tournament. A single round robin was played. Group was announced on 27 March 2014.

Group stage

Winners

Goalscorers
4 goals
 Abeer Al-Nahar

3 goals

 Manar Yaqoob
 Luna Al-Masri
 Stephanie Al-Naber
 Maysa Jbarah
 Klodi Salama

2 goals

 Yasmeen Fayez
 Sama'a Khraisat
 Walaa Hussein

1 goal

 Shaika Al-Anood
 Reem Al-Hashmi
 Enshirah Al-Hyasat
 Marwa Al-Majri
 Anfal Al-Sufy
 Shahnaz Jebreen
 Haya Khalil
 Ayah Majali
 Mai Sweilem
 Talin Abughazala
 Haneen Nasser
 Natali Shaheen
 Dana Al-Jassim
 Reem Al-Naemi

References

External links
 Official website
 Tournament at soccerway.com

WAFF Women's Championship
WAFF
2014
WAFF